Richard Shoemaker is a former member of the Wisconsin State Assembly and the Wisconsin State Senate.

Biography
Shoemaker was born on June 11, 1951, in Beloit, Wisconsin. He graduated from Menomonie High School in Menomonie, Wisconsin and the University of Wisconsin-Stout. Shoemaker is married with two children.

Career
Shoemaker was Supervisor of Dunn County, Wisconsin from 1976 to 1977 before serving as a member of the Assembly from 1978 to 1986. He was elected to the Senate in 1988. Shoemaker was a Democrat.

Shoemaker was convicted in 1988 of receiving illegal money from a lobbyist, failing to disclose a loan on financial disclosure statements, using his office for personal gain, defrauding his campaign committee and filing false campaign reports. He was charged campaign fund fraud and failure to disclose personal gains.  He was found guilty and sentenced to 60 days in jail. (1988)

References

Politicians from Beloit, Wisconsin
People from Menomonie, Wisconsin
County supervisors in Wisconsin
Democratic Party Wisconsin state senators
Democratic Party members of the Wisconsin State Assembly
University of Wisconsin–Stout alumni
1951 births
Living people
Wisconsin politicians convicted of crimes